Below are listed all participating squads of the 2000 Men's Olympic Volleyball Tournament. This 10th edition of the event, organised by the world's governing body, the FIVB, in conjunction with the IOC, was held in Australia's largest city, Sydney, from 17 September to 1 October 2000.

Pool A





Head coach: Juan Diaz Mariño







Pool B













References

External links
Team rosters at Todor66.com

2000
Men's team rosters
 
Men's events at the 2000 Summer Olympics